The Philippine Army Football Club is a professional football club based in the Philippines. It was founded in 1960 through the effort of the Philippine Army Special Services Unit, that promotes sports and physical fitness within the Army, under the direction of the commanding General. As the club name indicates, the team is composed of members of the Philippine Army.

History
In 2003, the club participated in the inaugural edition of ASEAN Club Championship held in Jakarta, Indonesia where they finished the tournament with 2 losses.

Philippine Army participated in the sole season of the Filipino Premier League in 2008, winning over Giligans
in the league final.

United Football League

Philippine Army F.C. played in the now-defunct United Football League, which was the de facto top tier league in the Philippines. Initially the club was among the top teams in the league, finishing third in the 2011 season. They finished 9th in the following two seasons in. The club avoided relegation by winning against Union Internacional Manila F.C. in the playoff.

For the 2014 UFL season, Philippine Army FC had a temporary merger with General Trias International FC and the military squad was bolstered by Korean players. The move was done due to difficulties in scheduling the training of its players, enlisted soldiers often called into duty. The team played as Philippine Army GTI for that season.

At the latter part of the 2015 season, Philippine Army was disqualified from the UFL including any related competitions.

They announced return for the 2023 Copa Paulino Alcantara.

Players
As a football club under the Armed Forces of the Philippines like the Philippine Navy F.C. and the Philippine Air Force F.C., Philippine Army F.C. can only sign players who are also enlisted in the Philippine Army. Though for the 2014 season the squad included non-Army enlistees with the temporary merger of the club with General Trias International FC.

The club had players who has played for the Philippines national team such as Roel Gener, Nestorio Margarse, and Eduard Sacapaño.

2020 squad

Former players 

 Lurix Araneta
 Rey Saluria
 Jesus Baron
 Judy Saluria
 Jeoffrey Lobaton
 Wilson Dela Cruz
 Billy Estrella
 Roel Gener
 Luisito Brillantes
 Eduard Sacapaño

Continental record

Honors

Domestic competitions
 Filipino Premier League
Winners (1): 2008

 UFL Cup
Runners-up (1): 2009

Records

Key
Tms. = Number of teams
Pos. = Position in league
TBD  = To be determined
DNQ  = Did not qualify
Note: Performances of the club indicated here was after the UFL Division 1 created (as a semi-pro league) in 2009.

References

External links 
 Philippine Army F.C. info

Football clubs in the Philippines
Association football clubs established in 1960
1960 establishments in the Philippines
Sports teams in Metro Manila
Army
Military sports clubs in the Philippines
Football club